Midway is an unincorporated community in Knox County, Tennessee, United States.

Seven Islands State Birding Park is located just south of Midway.

References

Unincorporated communities in Knox County, Tennessee
Unincorporated communities in Tennessee